Rose and Maloney is a British television crime drama series, produced by All3 Media, and broadcast on ITV1 between 29 September 2002 and 26 September 2005. The series stars Sarah Lancashire and Phil Davis as the principal characters, Rose Linden and Marion Maloney, who are investigators working for the fictional Criminal Justice Review Agency, who take on claims of miscarriages of justice, assessing whether there are grounds to reopen old cases. Rose Linden is portrayed as strong-willed and sometimes reckless; a woman who likes to follow her instincts and play hunches, who often comes into conflict with authority. Marion Maloney, although Rose's superior, usually allows himself to be led by his more passionate colleague. Maloney is by-the-book and a little grey, and he finds working with Rose dangerous but addictively exciting.

Additional cast members include Nisha Nayar, Susan Brown, Anne Reid and David Westhead. Guest stars throughout the series run include Tara Fitzgerald, Danny Dyer, Tiana Benjamin, Andrew-Lee Potts and Neil Dudgeon. Three series of the programme were broadcast, beginning with a two-part pilot episode on 29 September 2002. Due to strong viewing figures, a second series of six episodes - again, all two-part stories, was commissioned for broadcast in 2004, followed by a third series in 2005, which saw a slight change to the format, with each episode being self-contained, and the length of each episode extended. ITV chose not to re-commission the show for a fourth series. The series has never been released on DVD; however, all three series have been released, free-to-view, on YouTube, via the programme's production company, All3 Media.

Cast
 Sarah Lancashire as Rose Linden
 Phil Davis as Marion Maloney
 Nisha Nayar as Joyce Hammond
 Susan Brown as Wendy Sillery (Series 2)
 Andrew Lee Potts as Daniel Berrington (Series 2)
 Stephanie Leonidas as Katie Phelan (Series 2)
 Eamonn Walker as George Parris (Series 2)
 Anne Reid as Bea Linden (Series 2)
 Ramon Vaughan-Williams as Carl Callaghan (Series 3)
 Tara Fitzgerald as Annie Sorensen-Johnson (Series 3)
 Neil Dudgeon as Alan Richmond (Series 3)
 David Westhead as Wallace Canford (Series 3)

Episodes

Series 1 (2002)

Series 2 (2004)

Series 3 (2005)

References

External links

2002 British television series debuts
2005 British television series endings
2000s British drama television series
2000s British crime television series
ITV television dramas
Television series by All3Media
English-language television shows
Television shows set in the United Kingdom